The 1990 Grand Prix International de Paris was held in Paris. Medals were awarded in the disciplines of men's singles, ladies' singles, pair skating, and ice dancing.

Results

Men

Ladies

Pairs

Ice dancing

Sources
 Skate Canada Results Book
 Patinage Magazine N°25 (Décembre 1990-Janvier/Février 1991)
 Paris Première, aired on 10/11/1990

Grand Prix International de Paris, 1990
Internationaux de France
Figure
Figure skating in Paris
International figure skating competitions hosted by France